El Hanchane is a town in Essaouira Province, Marrakesh-Safi, Morocco. According to the 2004 census it had a population of 4,698.

References

Populated places in Essaouira Province
Municipalities of Morocco